Last Words is the autobiography of American stand-up comedian George Carlin. It was published on November 10, 2009. Last Words tells the story of his life from his conception, literally, to his final years; he died on June 22, 2008 at the age of 71. The book contains photos taken throughout Carlin's life.

In 1993, George Carlin asked his friend and bestselling author Tony Hendra to help him write his autobiography, although Carlin preferred to call it a "sortabiography". The two of them had scores of conversations, many of which were recorded, for almost fifteen years. During the conversations, they discussed Carlin's life, times, and evolution as a major comedian artist. After Carlin died, Hendra set out to assemble the book just as Carlin would have wanted.

This book was also released twice in Audiobook format.  The first recording at unabridged length narrated by Johnny Heller and the second with George's brother Patrick reading an abridgment.

References

External links 
 Last Words at Funny or Die

Books by George Carlin
2009 non-fiction books
Books published posthumously
English-language books
American autobiographies